Laubeuf Fjord is a sound in Antarctica,  long in a north-south direction and averaging  wide, lying between the east-central portion of Adelaide Island and the southern part of Arrowsmith Peninsula, Graham Land. It connects Hanusse Bay to the north with Marguerite Bay to the south. The southern 'border' between Laubeuf Fjord and Marguerite Bay is formed by the line between Rothera Point, Adelaide Island, and Cape Sáenz, which is the southernmost point of the Arrowsmith Peninsula. The fjord was discovered by the French Antarctic Expedition, 1908–10, under Jean-Baptiste Charcot, and named by him for Maxime Laubeuf, a French marine engineer who supervised building the engine for the ship Pourquoi-Pas.

There are several islands in Laubeuf Fjord. The largest and northernmost of these is Day Island, followed by Wyatt Island a bit further south. Still further south are the smaller Webb Island and Pinero Island. There are also various very small, mostly rocky islets, such as the Brockhamp Islands, Covey Rocks, Quilp Rock and Killingbeck Island.

Several large glaciers calve into Laubeuf Fjord. From the Arrowsmith Peninsula these are the Ward Glacier, the Vallot Glacier and the Nye Glacier. From Adelaide Island comes the huge Shambles Glacier that terminates in Stonehouse Bay, a large bay on the west side of Laubeuf Fjord.

See also 
Hinks Channel

References 

Sounds of Graham Land
Landforms of Adelaide Island
Loubet Coast